The fourth season of the reality television series Love & Hip Hop: Atlanta aired on VH1 from April 20, 2015 until August 31, 2015. The show was primarily filmed in Atlanta, Georgia. It was executively produced by Mona Scott-Young and Stephanie R. Gayle for Monami Entertainment, Toby Barraud, Stefan Springman, David DiGangi and Donna Edge-Rachell for Eastern TV, and Susan Levison, Nina L. Diaz, Ken Martinez and Vivian Gomez for VH1.

The series chronicles the lives of several women and men in the Atlanta area, involved in hip hop music. It consists of 19 episodes, including a two-part reunion special hosted by Nina Parker.

Production
On April 9, 2015, VH1 announced that Love & Hip Hop: Atlanta would be returning for a fourth season on April 20, 2015, and will premiere alongside Love & Hip Hop Atlanta: The Afterparty Live!, a half an hour long interactive after-show hosted by Big Tigger. With the exception of Tammy Rivera, all main cast members from the previous season returned, including Stevie J, who was finally promoted to the main cast. Stevie had appeared in every single episode prior to this season as a supporting cast member. Yung Joc's girlfriend Khadiyah Lewis joined the supporting cast, along with former-stripper-turned-rapper Jessica Dime, Nikko's wife Margeaux Simms, aspiring singer Ashley Nicole, Joc's baby mama Sina Bina, rapper Tiffany Foxx and Momma Dee's ex-husband Ernest Bryant. PreMadonna appeared in a minor supporting role for two episodes. Towards the end of the season, former main cast member Tammy Rivera returned in a supporting role for three episodes.

The season was released on DVD in region 1 on July 25, 2016.

On August 27, 2015, VH1 confirmed that Stevie J and Joseline Hernandez would star in their own spin-off series, set in Los Angeles. On December 2, 2015, VH1 announced Stevie J & Joseline: Go Hollywood, which premiered January 25, 2016.

Synopsis
After the shocking and violent events of last season's reunion, Joseline and Stevie J are forced to face hard truths as Stevie is sentenced to rehab. Nikko's wife Margeaux comes to town, ready to expose Mimi for her lies about the sex tape. Rasheeda suspects Kirk's relationship with his new artist Ashley Nicole may be more than just business. Joc struggles to pick sides as his four baby mamas declare war on his new girlfriend Khadiyah.

Reception
The series premiere garnered big ratings for the network, with VH1 announcing a combined rating of 6.2 million viewers. On August 19, 2015, VH1 announced the season as the summer's #1 cable reality series among adults 18-49 and women 18-49 and the 2nd most talked-about television series on social media overall.

Cast

Starring

 Mimi Faust (18 episodes)
 Rasheeda (19 episodes)
 Karlie Redd (16 episodes)
 Erica Dixon (13 episodes)
 Joseline Hernandez (17 episodes)
 Stevie J (18 episodes)

Also starring

 Jessica Dime (13 episodes)
 Dawn Heflin (7 episodes)
 Momma Dee (12 episodes)
 Lil Scrappy (14 episodes)
 Bambi Benson (11 episodes)
 Ariane Davis (10 episodes)
 Margeaux Simms (16 episodes)
 Nikko London (11 episodes)
 Kirk Frost (16 episodes)
 Ashley Nicole (9 episodes)
 Yung Joc (13 episodes)
 Khadiyah Lewis (13 episodes)
 Sina Bina (10 episodes)
 Deb Antney (6 episodes)
 Kalenna Harper (13 episodes)
 Tony Vick (12 episodes)
 Tiffany Foxx (7 episodes)
 Ernest Bryant (6 episodes)
 PreMadonna (2 episodes)
 Tammy Rivera (3 episodes)

K. Michelle returns in a guest appearance in one episode. Lil Scrappy's sister Jasmine Brown would appear as a guest star in several episodes. The show features minor appearances from notable figures within the hip hop industry and Atlanta's social scene, including Stevie J and Mimi's daughter Eva Jordan, Faith Evans, Jazze Pha, Ernest's mother Bessie Bryant, Shirleen Harvell, Ariane's girlfriend DJ Toni K, Jermaine Dupri and Lyfe Jennings.

Episodes

Music
Several cast members had their music featured on the show and released singles to coincide with the airing of the episodes.

Love & Hip Hop Atlanta: After Party Live!

Love & Hip Hop Atlanta: After Party Live! is a live after show, that aired during the show's fourth season. Big Tigger hosted the show starring cast members from Love & Hip Hop: Atlanta, as well as musicians, comedians and various television personalities from different reality shows by VH1 and other networks.

References

External links

2015 American television seasons
Love & Hip Hop